Casey Michael Beathard (born December 2, 1965) is an American country music songwriter. The son of former NFL general manager Bobby Beathard, and father to current Jacksonville Jaguars quarterback C. J. Beathard, and country music artist Tucker Beathard, he has co-written singles for several country music recording artists, including top-ten singles for Gary Allan, Billy Ray Cyrus, Trace Adkins, Kenny Chesney, and Eric Church. In 2004 and 2008, he received Broadcast Music, Inc.'s Songwriter of the Year award for his contributions.

Biography
Casey Beathard graduated in 1984 from Oakton High School, Vienna, Virginia, where he was a football star. Beathard graduated from Elon University in Elon, North Carolina, in 1990 with a degree in business management. While at Elon, he was a member of Kappa Sigma Fraternity and played football. Beathard moved to Nashville, Tennessee, in 1991 to find work as a songwriter. After finding work at various jobs in Nashville, he was eventually signed to a songwriting contract; his first cut as a songwriter was the title track of Kenny Chesney's 1998 album I Will Stand, which was released as a single that year. (Chesney later recorded "No Shoes, No Shirt, No Problems", another Beathard co-write, in 2002.) By the 2000s, many other country music artists had recorded Beathard's material, including Trace Adkins, Gary Allan, Tracy Byrd, and Billy Currington. For his contributions as a songwriter, Beathard received a Songwriter of the Year award from Broadcast Music Incorporated in 2004 and 2008.

In 2006, he received his first credit as a record producer, when he co-produced the track "I Wanna Feel Something" on Trace Adkins' Dangerous Man album. This was also Adkins' first co-production credit.

A year later, Beathard received additional honors from BMI as the co-writer of Tracy Lawrence's single "Find Out Who Your Friends Are", Lawrence's first number one in eleven years, and the first single for his personal Rocky Comfort label.

Beathard's son, C. J. Beathard, is a backup quarterback for the Jacksonville Jaguars. He played at the University of Iowa and was drafted by the San Francisco 49ers in the 2017 NFL draft. Another son, Tucker Beathard, is signed to Dot Records as a recording artist.

His son Clayton, a quarterback at Long Island University, was fatally stabbed during an altercation that began at around 2:50 a.m. Saturday, December 21, 2019, outside of the Dogwood Bar & Grill in Nashville.

Themes
Several of Casey Beathard's songs are up-tempo party anthems, occasionally centering on alcoholic beverages. The latter theme is most evident on the three cuts recorded by Byrd—"Ten Rounds with Jose Cuervo", "Drinkin' Bone", and "How'd I Wind Up in Jamaica"—as well as Trent Willmon's debut single "Beer Man", and "The World Needs a Drink" by Terri Clark. He has occasionally shown a more serious side to his songs as well, such as Jeff Bates's "The Love Song", Billy Currington's "Walk a Little Straighter", Billy Ray Cyrus's "Ready, Set, Don't Go", and Eric Church's "Homeboy".

Singles

References

American country singer-songwriters
Living people
Musicians from Nashville, Tennessee
1965 births
Singer-songwriters from Tennessee
Country musicians from Tennessee
American male singer-songwriters